Radosław Wiśniewski (born September 10, 1992) is a Polish professional footballer who plays as a striker for Vineta Wolin. Besides Poland, he has played in Spain.

Career

Club
Born in Kamień Pomorski, Wiśniewski went through the youth departments of hometown club Gryf and Iskra Golczewo before being scouted for the Ina Goleniów academy. After two seasons in the first team, he was signed by Pogoń Szczecin in February 2011, playing two league matches in his first half season for the club.

References

External links
 
 Radosław Wiśniewski at Pogoń

1992 births
Living people
People from Kamień Pomorski
Sportspeople from West Pomeranian Voivodeship
Association football forwards
Polish footballers
Pogoń Szczecin players
Bałtyk Gdynia players
Lorca FC players
Ekstraklasa players
Błękitni Stargard players